National Patriots' Party (in French: Parti National des Patriotes, PNP) is a Sankarist political party in Burkina Faso. Its president is Idrissou Kouanda.

Political parties in Burkina Faso
Sankarist political parties in Burkina Faso